Russell Goldencloud Weiner (born February 15, 1970) is an American businessman and works in political fundraising.

Early life and education
Weiner is the son of Michael Weiner, better known as conservative radio talk show host Michael Savage, and Janet Weiner. He is Jewish.

Weiner graduated from Redwood High School in Larkspur, California and graduated from San Diego State University with a bachelor's degree in political science. He organized events for the Paul Revere Society and worked as a travel consultant.

Career
He is the creator of the Rockstar energy drink. Weiner is also the founder and CEO of his own company, which is based in Las Vegas.

In 2016, he was 494th on the Forbes list of the 500 richest Americans with an estimated worth of 3.4 billion dollars.

Politics
He co-founded the Paul Revere Society with his father. In 1998, he ran as a Republican for the 6th district seat in the California State Assembly, receiving an endorsement from the president of the NAACP branch in Oakland, California. In June 1998, Weiner won the Republican primary election by five votes. His campaign positions included advocacy for Proposition 227, the ballot initiative eliminating bilingual education in public schools, and protection of old-growth forests. He lost to incumbent Democrat Kerry Mazzoni receiving 13.3% of the vote. After the election, some election posters depicting him were vandalized in an anti-Semitic manner.

In 2009, Weiner donated $25,000 to the California gubernatorial campaign of Gavin Newsom, who was the Democratic mayor of San Francisco. Newsom returned the donation and Weiner gave it to charity.

Personal life
Weiner has been in the real estate industry; he buys and sells houses. In 2006, he bought the West Hollywood home of basketball player Carlos Boozer for $10 million. In 2008, he listed another home there for about $3 million (originally it was nearly $15 million based on replacement costs) and sold it for $8 million in 2009.

Weiner lives in Delray Beach, Florida.

References

1970 births
Living people
20th-century American Jews
American drink industry businesspeople
American chief executives of food industry companies
American political fundraisers
Place of birth missing (living people)
Businesspeople from Los Angeles
California Republicans
People from Los Angeles County, California
People from Larkspur, California
People from West Hollywood, California
San Diego State University alumni
American billionaires
21st-century American Jews
Redwood High School (Larkspur, California) alumni